Jacinto Rey (born February 23, 1972 in Vigo) is a Spanish novelist. After completing his studies of economics in Spain and the UK, he worked for several multinational companies in Germany and Switzerland. Polyglot and widely travelled, he currently lives in France.

His first novel, El cirujano de Las Indias (The Surgeon of the Indies), was published in 2007, and highlights the contradictions of the Spanish colonization in America. In 2009 he made his first foray into crime fiction with El último cliente (The Last Customer), which opens the series with Amsterdam police inspector Cristina Molen. His second book in this series, El hombre de El Cairo (The Man from Cairo) has been released in 2011. Jacinto Rey is also the author of a book of poems, El pájaro alunado (The moonlit bird), and two books of short stories.

Works

Novels 
 El cirujano de Las Indias (The Surgeon of the Indies). Historical fiction. Ediciones El Andén, June 2007. .
 El último cliente (The Last Customer). Crime fiction. Editorial Viceversa, May 2009. .
 El hombre de El Cairo. (The Man from Cairo). Crime fiction. Editorial Viceversa, January 2011. .

Short stories 
 El pintor de La Habana y otros relatos.

Poetry 
 El pájaro alunado (The moonlit bird).

External links 
 Official Author Site
 El último cliente
 El hombre de El Cairo

1972 births
Living people
People from Vigo
Writers from Galicia (Spain)
Spanish novelists
Spanish male novelists